This is a complete list of members of the United States Senate during the 106th United States Congress listed by seniority, from January 3, 1999, to January 3, 2001.

Order of service is based on the commencement of the senator's first term. Behind this is former service as a senator (only giving the senator seniority within his or her new incoming class), service as vice president, a House member, a cabinet secretary, or a state governor. The final factor is the population of the senator's state.

Senators who were sworn in during the middle of the two-year congressional term (up until the last senator who was not sworn in early after winning the November 2000 election) are listed at the end of the list with no number.

During the 106th Congress, the US Senate had a Republican majority. In this Congress, Tim Hutchinson was the most junior senior senator, until Paul Coverdell's death on July 18, 2000, after which Max Cleland was the most junior senior senator. Ernest Hollings was the most senior junior senator.

Terms of service

U.S. Senate seniority list

See also
106th United States Congress
List of members of the United States House of Representatives in the 106th Congress by seniority

Notes

External links
Senate Seniority List

106
106th United States Congress